Phymatoctenus is a genus of South American and Caribbean wandering spiders first described by Eugène Simon in 1897.  it contains only three species in Brazil, Cuba, and Costa Rica: P. comosus, P. sassii, and P. tristani.

References

Araneomorphae genera
Ctenidae
Spiders of Central America
Spiders of South America
Taxa named by Eugène Simon